Patna City, popularly known as Patna Saheb or Patna Sahib, is a city and one of the 6 Sub-divisions (Tehsil) in Patna district, Bihar, India. Patna City is an old area of Patna. Patna City history belongs to Patliputra. It is regarded as very sacred by the Sikhs in India. The tenth Guru of the Sikhs, Guru Gobind Singh was born there. The Patna Saheb Gurudwara is considered to be one of the holiest of the five "Takhts" or seat of authority of the Sikhs. The place is named Harminder Takht though the Sikhs respectfully call it Patna Sahib. The famous Guru Gobind Sahib Gurudwara is an important shrine for Sikhs from all over the world. Ashok Rajpath (road) connects Patna City to Patna.

Overview
Bengali Colony, Jhauganj, Lodi Katra, Rambagh, Kali Asthan, Nehru Tola, Marufganj, Harmandir Gali, Machratta, Hajiganj, Mirchai Gali, Bihar Mills Colony are major areas of Patna City. The main Guru Gobind road connects Patna Sahib Gurudwara and Patna City Chowk. Mangal Talab is a water body located here. Patna City has all sorts of facilities like schools, hospitals for its residents. Other than Sikh Religious center it has a number of Hindu Temples and Mosques.  It has a number of Boarding and Lodging facilities around religious centers. Patna Ghat is the Ganga side Ghat flowing in north of Patna City. Today, Patna City is also a major trading centre.

Administration
The Patna City sub-division (Tehsil) is headed by an IAS or state Civil service officer of the rank of Sub Divisional Magistrate (SDM).

Blocks
The Patna City Tehsil is divided into 3 Blocks, each headed by a Block Development Officer (BDO). List of Blocks is as follows:
 Fatuha
 Daniyawaan
 Khusrupur

Tourism

Sanwaliya Ji Mandir, Hajiganj.
Shri Jalla Mahavir Mandir

Rani Sati Dadi Mandir, Mirchai Gali
Shri Shyam Mandir, Raja Ram Lane
Shri Kale Hanuman Mandir
Bal Leela Gurudwara, Maini Sangat
Bahari Begumpur (a historic place)
Khanqah Emadia Qalandaria, Mangal Talab 
Khanqah Munamia Hasania, Teeksaal Darguah 
Railway Quarter, Patna City
Mangal Talab (talab means tank), named after the donor Shri Mangal Lal, a local landlord.
Kashmiri Bagh (graveyard)
Old Cemetery, Patna City
Jalla Area (Hanuman Mandir, Shani mandir)
Manoj Kamaliya Stadium, a small outdoor stadium at Mangal Talab.
Takht Sri Harimandir Sahib Ji
Gurudwara Shri Guru Ka Bagh
Paschim Darwaza, a historical monument of Mauryan period

Politics
The Patna City is part of the Patna Sahib Assembly constituency under the Patna Sahib Lok Sabha constituency.

Education

Schools 
Arora International School, Patna city
Guru Gobind Singh Boys School (Government aided)
Guru Gobind Singh Girls School (Government aided)
Infant Jesus School
Jesus and Marry Academy, Patna city
Little Flower High School
Marwari High School, Patna City (Government aided)
Narayani Kanya Vidyalaya (Government aided)
Patna City Central School
Patna City High School (Government aided)
ST. Annes High School
St. Paul High School, Patna city
Sudarshan Central School

College 

Oriental college, Patna city
 Sri Guru Gobind Singh College, Patna
 RPM College, Patna

Library 

Bihar Hitaishi District Central Library, Patna City (A central government recognized district level library)

Hospital
Guru Gobind Singh Hospital, Patna city
Nalanda Medical College and Hospital, Patna city

Transport

Railways 
It has its own railway station, known as Patna Sahib railway station. It is connected to many metropolitan cities of India by the Howrah-Delhi Main Line.

Roads 
The Bus service was started in 2018 by BSRTC 15 buses has been operational on these routes connecting 17 different locations between Gandhi Maidan and Patna City, three major railway stations, including the Patna Junction, Rajendra Nagar Terminal and Patna Sahib station, will be covered under the new route called ‘555’. The route has been named ‘555’ as a sign of respect for Panj Pyare — the five beloved ones of Sikh Guru Gobind Singh.

State government is also planning to upgrade current three-wheelers (autos) which are emitting carbon dioxide on higher level due to petrol based engine to CNG operated autos, they will be upgraded on government subsidy PPP partnership either exchanged or made petrol to CNG emission adaptable by installing P2G CNG kits. Currently electronic operated rickshaws can be easily seen on the roads of Patna City.

Police Stations 
The following Police Stations of Patna Police serve this area:
 Chowk Police Station
 Deedarganj Police Station
 Khajekalan Police Station

Notable People 
 Guru Gobind Singh, The tenth Sikh Guru
 Daler Mehndi, Indian singer and songwriter
 Nand Kishore Yadav, Current MLA from Patna Sahib Constituency

References 

Neighbourhoods in Patna